|}

The Jersey Stakes is a Group 3 flat horse race in Great Britain open to three-year-old horses. It is run at Ascot over a distance of 7 furlongs (1,408 metres), and it is scheduled to take place each year in June.

The event was established when a three-year cycle of races called the Triennial Stakes was discontinued after World War I. The Triennial Stakes had comprised a race for two-year-olds over 5 furlongs, a race for three-year-olds over 7 furlongs, and a race for four-year-olds over 2 miles. Horses would return each year to compete over the increasing distances.

The Jersey Stakes replaced the second leg of the Triennial Stakes in 1919. It was named after the 4th Earl of Jersey, who served as the Master of the Buckhounds in the late eighteenth century.

The race is now run on the final day of the five-day Royal Ascot meeting.

Records
Leading jockey (6 wins):
 Sir Gordon Richards – Rattlin the Reefer (1929), Medieval Knight (1934), Theft (1935), Cave Man (1938), Nebuchadnezzar (1947), Rhinehart (1953)
 Lester Piggott – Favorita (1961), The Creditor (1963), Young Christopher (1964), Gay Fandango (1975), Hard Fought (1980), Rasa Penang (1981)

Leading trainer (6 wins):
 Sir Michael Stoute – Etienne Gerard (1977), Hard Fought (1980), Zilzal (1989), Among Men (1997), Jeremy (2006), Expert Eye (2018)

Winners since 1963

Earlier winners

Triennial Stakes
The second leg of the Triennial Stakes was contested by three-year-olds over 7 furlongs, and it was first run in 1849.

 1849: Borneo
 1850: no race
 1851: Miserrima
 1852: Songstress
 1853: Filbert
 1854: Meteora
 1855: Claret
 1856: Fly-by-Night
 1857–58: no race
 1859: St Clarence
 1860: The Wizard
 1861: Lupus
 1862: no race
 1863: Queen Bertha
 1864: Blair Athol
 1865: Broomielaw
 1866: Janitor
 1867: Vauban
 1868: Vale Royal
 1869: Duke of Beaufort
 1870: Normanby
 1871: Ripponden
 1872: Cremorne
 1873: The Laird of Holywell
 1874: Volturno
 1875: Ladylove
 1876: Morning Star
 1877: Placida
 1878: Jannette
 1879: Dalnaspidal II
 1880: Muncaster
 1881: Limestone
 1882: Shotover
 1883: Galliard
 1884: Talisman
 1885: Dandie Dimont
 1886: Mephisto
 1887: Jersey Lily
 1888: Rada
 1889: Cherry Bounce
 1890: Blue-green
 1891: Peter Flower
 1892: May Duke
 1893: Prisoner
 1894: Florizel II
 1895: Utica
 1896: Labrador
 1897: Cortegar
 1898: Nun Nicer
 1899: Santa Casa
 1900: Rice
 1901: Veles
 1902: Fowling-Piece
 1903: Rabelais
 1904: Henry the First
 1905: Polymelus
 1906: Troutbeck
 1907: Acclaim
 1908: Rhodora
 1909: Louviers
 1910: Admiral Hawke
 1911: Alice
 1912: Hector
 1913: Light Brigade
 1914: Sunny Lake
 1915–18: no race

Jersey Stakes

 1919: Knight of the Air
 1920: Tete a Tete
 1921: Gask
 1922: Dragoon
 1923: Friar
 1924: Blue Pete
 1925: Sherwood Starr
 1926: Review Order
 1927: Kincardine
 1928: Speyside
 1929: Rattlin the Reefer
 1930: Paradine
 1931: St Oswald
 1932: Limelight
 1933: Fur Tor
 1934: Medieval Knight
 1935: Theft
 1936: Thankerton
 1937: Lady of Shalott
 1938: Cave Man
 1939: Fairstone
 1940–45: no race
 1946: Sayani
 1947: Nebuchadnezzar
 1948: Hyperbole
 1949: Star King *
 1950: Double Eclipse
 1951: Royal Serenade
 1952: Kara Tepe
 1953: Rhinehart
 1954: Marshal Ney
 1955: Windsor Sun
 1956: Adare
 1957: Quorum
 1958: Faith Healer
 1959: Welsh Guard
 1960: Red Gauntlet
 1961: Favorita
 1962: Catchpole

* The 1949 winner Star King was later exported to Australia and renamed Star Kingdom.

See also
 Horse racing in Great Britain
 List of British flat horse races

References
 Paris-Turf:
 Racing Post:

 galopp-sieger.de – Jersey Stakes.
 horseracingintfed.com – International Federation of Horseracing Authorities – Jersey Stakes (2018).
 pedigreequery.com – Jersey Stakes – Ascot.
 

Flat races in Great Britain
Ascot Racecourse
Flat horse races for three-year-olds
Recurring sporting events established in 1919
1919 establishments in England